Andy Burton is a pitchside reporter and commentator, currently best known as a touchline reporter for Sky Sports.  He has worked for Capital Radio and Bravo.  He hit the headlines after launching an assault on presenter Richard Bacon in a dispute over his ex girlfriend in 2007. He was the main commentator on Bravo's Football Challenge joined by Andy Goldstein. He commentated for Sky Sports, on Premiership football matches shown in their Saturday evening highlights show, Football First.

On 25 January 2011, Burton was suspended by Sky due to his involvement in the sexist comments made about a female assistant referee, Sian Massey, which also involved Andy Gray and Richard Keys. However, unlike Gray and Keys, Burton later returned to his regular duties at Sky.

He was a scout at AFC Bournemouth for less than a season.

References

Sports commentators
Year of birth missing (living people)
Living people